Andrew Robert Oldridge (born 17 November 1957) is an English former professional footballer who played as a forward in the Football League.

References

1957 births
Living people
People from Barton-upon-Humber
English footballers
Association football forwards
Grimsby Town F.C. players
English Football League players